The North Carolina United States Senate election of 1974 was held on November 5, 1974 as part of the nationwide elections to the Senate. Incumbent Democrat, Sam Ervin, chose to retire.  The general election was fought between the Democratic nominee Robert Morgan and the Republican nominee William Stevens.

Democratic primary

Candidates
Nick Galifianakis, U.S. Representative from Durham and 1972 senate nominee
James Johnson
Robert Burren Morgan, Attorney General of North Carolina
Henry Wilson

Results

Republican primary

Candidates
William Stevens
B. E. Sweatt
Wood Hall Young

Results

General election

Results

See also 
 United States Senate elections, 1974 and 1975

References 

1974
North Carolina
1974 North Carolina elections